Raymond Edward Peet (January 27, 1921 – September 10, 2021) was an American vice admiral in the United States Navy. He was born in Oneonta, New York to U.L. and Hanna (née Thomas) Peet. He was a former commander of the United States First Fleet (from August 1, 1970 – May 15, 1972). He graduated from the United States Naval Academy in 1943. Other commands he held include Acting Assistant Secretary of Defense (International Security Affairs) and Director, Defense Security Assistance Agency. Married to Dian, he resided in La Jolla, California, and served as a consultant, manager, and on the boards of many private and public corporations. Peet died in La Jolla, California in September 2021, at the age of 100.

References

External links
Raymond Edward Peet Papers, 1943-1972 MS 200 held by Special Collections & Archives, Nimitz Library at the United States Naval Academy

1921 births
2021 deaths
American centenarians
Men centenarians
People from La Jolla, San Diego
People from Oneonta, New York
United States Navy personnel of the Korean War
United States Navy personnel of the Vietnam War
United States Navy personnel of World War II
United States Navy vice admirals
Military personnel from California